Goteysh (also Romanized as Goţeysh, Gatīsh, and Gotīsh; also known as Ḩarmaleh, Komeyt, Kumait, Qowmāt, and Qūmāt) is a village in Ahudasht Rural District, Shavur District, Shush County, Khuzestan Province, Iran. At the 2006 census, its population was 230, in 32 families.

References 

Populated places in Shush County